William H. Gray (March 2, 1841 – February 14, 1919) was a Baptist minister and state legislator in Mississippi. He served in the Mississippi Senate during the Reconstruction era.

He was an outspoken advocate for civil rights and equal protection.

He was appointed a trustee of Tougaloo University. He sang at the Mt. Helm Colored Baptist Church on Thanksgiving Day in 1870.

After departing Mississippi he was a church leader in Kentucky and then Illinois. He was involved in controversies and accused of embezzling money.

See also
African-American officeholders during and following the Reconstruction era

References

1841 births
1919 deaths
Mississippi state senators
African-American politicians during the Reconstruction Era
Baptists from Mississippi
Tougaloo College
Baptist ministers from the United States
19th-century American politicians